Robert McKenzie Walls (13 July 1908 – 1992) was a Scottish professional football forward who played in the Scottish League for Hibernian, Cowdenbeath, St Bernard's and Heart of Midlothian. He also played in the Football League for Aldershot.

Personal life 
After the Second World War, Walls emigrated to Canada.

Career statistics

Honours 
Hibernian

 Scottish League Division Two: 1932–33

Cowdenbeath

 Scottish League Division Two: 1938–39

Individual

Cowdenbeath Hall of Fame

References 

Scottish footballers
Cowdenbeath F.C. players
Scottish Football League players
Place of birth missing
Heart of Midlothian F.C. players
St Bernard's F.C. players
Hibernian F.C. players
Hibernian F.C. wartime guest players
Scottish emigrants to Canada
English Football League players
Aldershot F.C. players
1908 births
1992 deaths
People from Leith
Waterford F.C. players
League of Ireland players
Scottish expatriate sportspeople in Ireland
Scottish expatriate footballers
Expatriate association footballers in the Republic of Ireland
Aberdeen F.C. wartime guest players
Association football forwards